The following are the national records in athletics in Andorra maintained by its national athletics federation: Federació Andorrana d'Atletisme (FAA).

Outdoor

Key to tables:

+ = en route to a longer distance

h = hand timing

Men

Women

Indoor

Men

Women

Notes

References
General
Andorran Records – Outdoor 31 December 2021 updated
Andorran Records – Indoor 31 December 2021 updated
Specific

External links
FAA web site

Andorra
Athletics
Records
Athletics